The 1962 Coupe de France Final was a football match held at Stade Olympique Yves-du-Manoir, Colombes on May 13, 1962, that saw AS Saint-Étienne defeat FC Nancy 1–0 thanks to a goal by Jean-Claude Baulu.

Match details

See also
Coupe de France 1961-62

External links
Coupe de France results at Rec.Sport.Soccer Statistics Foundation
Report on French federation site

Coupe De France Final
1962
Coupe De France Final 1962
Sport in Hauts-de-Seine
May 1962 sports events in Europe
1962 in Paris